Gábor Simon (born 15 June 1964) is a Hungarian teacher and politician, a member of the National Assembly from 2002 to 2014. He represented Pestszentlőrinc between 2006 and 2010. He served as Secretary of State for Social Affairs and Labour from 2008 to 2010.

He was the deputy leader of the Hungarian Socialist Party until February 2014, when his membership was suspended due to a corruption scandal.

Political career
He secured a seat in the National Assembly from the party's Budapest Regional List during the 2002 parliamentary election. He was elected MP for Pestszentlőrinc (Budapest Constituency XXVI) in the 2006 parliamentary election. From 30 May 2006 to 18 February 2008, he served as Chairman of the Committee on Employment and Labour. He became a member of the National Assembly from the party's National List in the 2010 parliamentary election. He was appointed Chairman of the Committee on Consumer Protection on 2 June 2010.

References

1964 births
Living people
Hungarian educators
Hungarian Socialist Party politicians
Members of the National Assembly of Hungary (2002–2006)
Members of the National Assembly of Hungary (2006–2010)
Members of the National Assembly of Hungary (2010–2014)
People from Sopron